Mirror of Retribution is the fifth studio album by Taiwanese black metal band Chthonic, released in 2009. The album, as with previous albums is based upon concepts of historical facts (as with previous studio album Seediq Bale), an ancient myth of hell, and contains references to the 228 Massacre. The band adopted a new logo starting with this album, as seen on its cover; as well as a new stage presence based upon Taoist magic figures of folklore and the types of facial masks they wore.

Track listing

Personnel
Freddy Lim – vocals, hena
Jesse Liu – guitar
Dani Wang – drums
Doris Yeh – bass
CJ – piano, synthesizer

References

Chthonic (band) albums
2009 albums